Gavin Glinton (born 1 March 1979 in Grand Turk) is a Turks and Caicos Islands football coach and former professional soccer player. He played for the LA Galaxy, Dallas Burn, and San Jose Earthquakes in the MLS. He also played for the Charleston Battery and Carolina Railhawks in the USL. He is currently the Technical Director at Sacramento United Soccer Club, having previously serving as an Assistant Coach for New Mexico United, and the U13 and U14 Academy Coach at Sacramento Republic FC.

Career

College and amateur
Glinton grew up in Livermore, California, attended Livermore High School, played club soccer with Tri-Valley Soccer Club. He also played PDL with the Silicon Valley Ambassadors, and played four years of college soccer at Bradley University, where he was a four-time All-American. He scored 53 career goals at Bradley, including 15 in 1998 and 2000, was named to the All-Missouri Valley Conference First-team all four seasons (becoming first player in league history to earn first team honours four times), and was named his team's offensive MVP all four years. During his college years he also played with the Chicago Fire Reserves in the Premier Development League. He was inducted into the Bradley University Hall of Fame in 2012 and the Missouri Valley Conference Hall of Fame in 2014.

Professional
Glinton was drafted by Major League Soccer's Los Angeles Galaxy in 2002 before transferring to the Dallas Burn in 2003. His two-year totals include 44 games played with two goals and six assists. In 2004, he took a break from professional football to become assistant coach at his alma mater, Bradley University.

In 2006, he joined USL First Division team Charleston Battery for the 2006 season. After a successful season with the Battery where he led the team with 13 goals and was elected "Offensive MVP" by the fans, Glinton was called up by the Galaxy. He proved to be a great clutch player after the 2007 season. In the 2007 season, he was mostly used as a substitute by Galaxy coach Frank Yallop, where he scored 4 goals. Gavin followed Yallop to the San Jose Earthquakes when the coach selected him in the 2007 MLS Expansion Draft. The Earthquakes released him following the 2008 season. In February 2009, he had an unsuccessful two week trial with St Patrick's Athletic of the League of Ireland, whom he played for in a friendly game against Premier League club Chelsea, drawing 2–2. Later that month, he signed with the Carolina RailHawks in the USL First Division. He joined Nam Định F.C. of the V-League of Vietnam in March 2010.

International
Gavin Glinton plays for the Turks and Caicos Islands national team, and is their highest ever goalscorer with four goals. He scored one of the goals in the country's first ever win in a FIFA international over the Cayman Islands in a Caribbean Cup game in Cuba. He has earned eight caps in total, three of them in World Cup qualification games.

Personal
Gavin's younger brother, Duane Glinton, formerly of the Ogden Outlaws in the Premier Development League, also played for the national team and was the all-time national team appearances record holder before being surpassed by Philip Shearer.

Honors

Los Angeles Galaxy
MLS Cup (1): 2002
Major League Soccer Supporter's Shield (1): 2002

References

External links
 Carolina RailHawks bio
 
 
 Bradley Braves bio
 V-League bottom side signs former LA Galaxy player
 

1979 births
Living people
Turks and Caicos Islands emigrants to the United States
Association football forwards
Turks and Caicos Islands footballers
Turks and Caicos Islands international footballers
Bradley Braves men's soccer players
Chicago Fire U-23 players
LA Galaxy players
FC Dallas players
Charleston Battery players
San Jose Earthquakes players
North Carolina FC players
Nam Định F.C. players
St Patrick's Athletic F.C. players
Major League Soccer players
USL First Division players
USL League Two players
V.League 1 players
Turks and Caicos Islands expatriate footballers
Expatriate soccer players in the United States
Turks and Caicos Islands expatriate sportspeople in the United States
Turks and Caicos Islands expatriate sportspeople in Vietnam
Expatriate footballers in Vietnam
LA Galaxy draft picks